Francisco Moreno Barrón (born 3 October 1954) is a Mexican bishop who served as auxiliary bishop in the Arquidiócesis of Morelia from 2002 to 2008 and. On 28 March 2008 Benedict XVI appointed him as the third bishop of Tlaxcala. He was installed in the diocese on 28 May 2008, and has served since then as shepherd of this diocese. On June 16, 2016, Pope Francis appointed him Archbishop of Tijuana.

Life
Francisco Moreno Barrón was born in the city of Salamanca, Guanajuato state in Mexico on 3 October 1954. He studied for the priesthood at the Seminary of Morelia, which he entered in 1966.

He was ordained a priest by the then-Archbishop Emeritus of Morelia, Estanislao Alcaraz Figueroa, on 25 February 1979. For five years he served as pastor in the parish of Santa Ana in Zacapu, and later was rector of the Temple of Christ the King in Morelia, responsible for diocesan youth ministry. He was rector and first pastor of the Lord of Mercy in Morelia until 2000, when he was appointed Episcopal Vicar.

On 2 February 2002 Pope John Paul II appointed him as an Auxiliary Bishop of Morelia. On 20 March 2002 he was consecrated by Mons. Alberto Suárez Inda. He continued to work with young people in the Mexican Episcopal Conference until 28 March 2008, when he was appointed as third bishop of Tlaxcala by Pope Benedict XVI. Pope Francis later appointed him as the Archbishop of Tijuana on 16 June 2016.

References

External links

People from Guanajuato
1954 births
Living people